Angelo Vassallo (22 September 1953 – 5 September 2010) was an Italian politician who served as the mayor of Pollica.

On 5 September 2010, Vassallo was shot to death by unknown person(s) with nine bullets in his native town of Acciaroli at around 22:15. He is survived by his wife and two children.

The film Mayor Fisherman (Il sindaco pescatore, 2016) was loosely based on the story of Vassallo.

References

1953 births
2010 deaths
Deaths by firearm in Italy
People from the Province of Salerno
Assassinated Italian politicians
Mayors of places in Campania
People murdered in Campania
People murdered by the Camorra